Baotou Metro is a proposed metro system to serve the city of Baotou, Inner Mongolia, China. Construction started in May 2017, and Lines 1 & 2 were to be open by 2022 when initial go ahead was granted by the NDRC in 2016, but the project was put on hold by the NDRC in November 2017 owing to concerns over cost.

Line planning 
Construction was to begin on the Yuan 20.19bn ($US 3bn) project in May 2017 with commissioning scheduled for 2021.

Construction was due to begin in 2018 and the line is to open in 2022.

In the longer-term a  six-line network with 125 stations was envisaged. However the entire plan is suspended as of November 2017.

References 

Underground rapid transit in China
Baotou
Rail transport in Inner Mongolia
Proposed public transport in China